Chemainus is an English adaptation of a 19th-century chief's name, stz'uminus, meaning "broken chest".  Its primary use is the town of Chemainus, British Columbia.  Other uses include:

the Chemainus River
Chemainus River Provincial Park
Chemainus Secondary School
Chemainus railway station
the former Chemainus Indian Band now styles itself the Stz'uminus First Nation.
Chemainus Indian Reserve No. 13, the main reserve of that government and its community